Cristóbal Martínez de Salas (1572 – October 22, 1640) was a Catholic prelate who served as Bishop of Panamá (1625–1640).

Biography
Cristóbal Martínez de Salas was born in Medina del Campo, Spain and ordained a priest in the Order of Canons Regular of Prémontré.
On May 10, 1625, Pope Urban VIII, appointed him Bishop of Panamá. On January 18, 1626, he was consecrated bishop by Alfonso López Gallo, Bishop of Valladolid with Miguel Ayala, Bishop of Palencia and Juan López, Bishop of Monopoli as Co-Consecrators. He served as Bishop of Panamá until his death on October 22, 1640.

References

External links and additional sources
 (for Chronology of Bishops) 
 (for Chronology of Bishops) 

1572 births
1640 deaths
Bishops appointed by Pope Urban VIII
Premonstratensian bishops
17th-century Roman Catholic bishops in Panama
People from Medina del Campo
Spanish people in colonial Latin America
Roman Catholic bishops of Panamá